Casey Wallace (born August 3, 1990) is an American sport shooter.

He participated at the 2018 ISSF World Shooting Championships.

References

External links

Living people
1990 births
American male sport shooters
Trap and double trap shooters
Sportspeople from Torrance, California